Patrick Breen (born 21 March 1957) is an Irish former Fine Gael politician who served as a Minister of State from 2016 to 2020. He served as a Teachta Dála (TD) for the Clare constituency from 2002 to 2020.

Having been a member of Clare County Council and the Vocational Educational Committee from June 1999 to May 2002, Breen was first elected to Dáil Éireann at the 2002 general election. He was the Chairman of the Oireachtas Foreign Affairs and Trade Committee and is deputy leader of the Irish Delegation to the Council of Europe.

While Fine Gael were in opposition, Breen was the Fine Gael deputy Spokesperson on Foreign Affairs, with special responsibility for Human Rights and Overseas Development Aid; and deputy Spokesperson on Transport and Enterprise, and Enterprise, Trade and Employment, with special responsibility for Small Business. He has also served as a member of the Oireachtas Transport Committee, the Privileges and Procedures Committee, the House Services Committee and the Committee on Enterprise and Small Business.

On 19 May 2016, on the nomination of Taoiseach Enda Kenny, he was appointed by the Fine Gael–Independent government as Minister of State at the Department of Jobs, Enterprise and Innovation with special responsibility for Employment and Small Business.

On 20 June 2017, on the nomination of Taoiseach Leo Varadkar, he was appointed by the Fine Gael–Independent government as Minister of State at the Department of Business, Enterprise and Innovation, at the Department of Employment Affairs and Social Protection, at the Department of the Taoiseach and at the Department of Justice and Equality with special responsibility for Trade, Employment, Business, EU Digital Single Market and Data Protection.

He lost his seat at the 2020 general election, continuing in office as a junior minister until the formation of a new government on 27 June 2020.

References

External links

Pat Breen's page on the Fine Gael website

 

1957 births
Living people
Fine Gael TDs
Local councillors in County Clare
Members of the 29th Dáil
Members of the 30th Dáil
Members of the 31st Dáil
Members of the 32nd Dáil
Ministers of State of the 32nd Dáil
Politicians from County Clare